This is a list of major companies and organizations in the Charlotte metropolitan area, through corporate or subsidiary headquarters or through significant operational and employment presence in and around the American city of Charlotte, North Carolina. The Charlotte metropolitan area is home to seven Fortune 500 companies, numbers in italics denote Fortune 500 ranking.

704Games
AEBN
Amazon
Albemarle Corporation
American Airlines
American City Business Journals
American Spirit Media
Amwins Group Inc
Archway Cookies
Atrium Health
Babcock & Wilcox
Baja Broadband
Baker & Taylor
Balfour Beatty
Bank of America 24
Barings
Belk
Bojangles' Famous Chicken 'n Biscuits
Bowles Hollowell Connor & Co.
Boxman Studios
Carlisle Companies
Carolina Foods
Carolina Weekly Newspaper Group
Cato Corporation
Cedar Fair
Centene Corporation 61
CertusBank
Charlotte Research Institute 
Charter Communications
Chip Ganassi Racing
Coca-Cola Bottling Co. Consolidated
Commercial National Bank
CommunityOne Bank
Compass Group
Consolidated Theatres
Continental AG
Crowder Construction Company
Dale Earnhardt, Inc.
DeVry University
Deep Elm Records
Dimensional Fund Advisors
Dixon Hughes Goodman
Dole Food Company
Dollar Tree 134
Domtar
Duke Energy 125
ECPI University
ESPNU
EchoPark Automotive
EnPro Industries 
Environmental Performance Vehicles
Eurest Support Services 
Extended Stay America
FairPoint Communications 
Fifth Third Bank
First Union (bought by Wells Fargo)
Food Lion
Ginn Racing
GPS Air
HDG International Group
Harris Teeter
Hendrick Motorsports
Herzog-Jackson Motorsports 
Honeywell - 77
Horizon Lines
ITT Technical Institute
Information Age Publishing
Ingersoll Rand
Ivey's
JR Motorsports
Joe Gibbs Racing
LPL Financial
Lance Inc.
LendingTree
Lowe's 40
Krispy Kreme
MAACO
Meineke Car Care Center
MetLife 43
Microsoft 35
NASCAR Inc.
National Gypsum
National Junior College Athletic Association
NationsBank (renamed as Bank of America)
North Carolina Research Campus
Novant Health
Nucor 151
Pamlico Capital
Petro Express
Pokertek
Rack Room Shoes
Red Ventures
Richard Petty Motorsports
Rusty Wallace Racing
SEC Network
SPX Corporation
Scientigo
Sealed Air 456
Showmars
Shutterfly
Snyder's-Lance
Sonic Automotive 298
Southern Professional Hockey League
Speed
Speedway Motorsports
Strayer University
TD Bank
TIAA
The Art Institutes 
The Campus Market
The Inspiration Networks
Vanguard
Time Warner Cable 98
Trail Motorsport
Truist Financial
UAV Corporation
US Airways
UTC Aerospace Systems
Verbatim Corporation
WORX
Wells Fargo 26
Wheresville Records
Wyndham Capital Mortgage

See also

 Economy of North Carolina
 List of North Carolina companies

References

 
Charlotte
Charlotte